Gregory Mark Sainsbury (born 1956) is a New Zealand journalist and broadcaster. He hosted Close Up on TVNZ's TV ONE until the show was axed on 30 November 2012. Previously he was the political editor for ONE News. In February 2016, he replaced Sean Plunket as weekday morning host on Radio Live, until the station closed down and ceased operating in January 2019.

Sainsbury grew up in Upper Hutt. He lives in Wellington with his wife Ramona who has a law practice. They have adult children who are twins. After school, Sainsbury started studying towards a law degree but did not finish it.

He won the 2007 Best Presenter Qantas Media Award for fronting Close Up, and moderated the live leaders debate for the 2008 New Zealand general election.

The Sunday Star-Times has described his moustache as "arguably the most famous in the country".

See also
 List of New Zealand television personalities

References

External links
 Mark Sainsbury at TVNZ

1956 births
Living people
New Zealand television presenters
Radio Live